Antonio Vutov (born 6 June 1996) is a Bulgarian professional footballer who plays for Lokomotiv Sofia as an attacking midfielder, forward or winger.

Vutov began his career with Levski Sofia. He joined Serie A club Udinese in January 2014, and had loan spells at Cosenza, Lecce, Botev Plovdiv and Levski before moving permanently to Botev in 2018.

He has also represented Bulgaria internationally at under-17, under-19 and under-21 levels.

Club career
Born in Mezdra, Vutov began his career at his hometown club, Lokomotiv Mezdra. When he was 12 years old he was the captain of the U-15 team of Lokomotiv Mezdra.

Levski Sofia
In 2009, he joined Levski Sofia Academy. Vutov made his senior debut for Levski on 8 April 2012, in a 1–1 league draw against Lokomotiv Sofia at the age of 15 years and 307 days, making him the youngest player ever to have played for the club. His first start came in a home league game against Beroe Stara Zagora on 11 May.

Vutov's first goal came in a 7–1 win against Etar 1924 at the Georgi Asparuhov Stadium, on 28 November 2012.

For 2013–14 season, Vutov was handed number 10, last worn by Hristo Yovov. He started to play more often as a first-team regular and for 6 months he made 24 appearances and scored 3 goals in all competitions. Vutov helped Levski to reach the Quarterfinals of the Bulgarian Cup after a 7-6 penalty win against CSKA Sofia, he scored one of the penalties for his team.

Udinese
During the winter break club's boss Todor Batkov announced that Levski are going to sell Antonio to Italian side Udinese. Vutov signed a four-and-a-half-year contract on 9 January and the transfer was officially announced on 11 January 2014 on Udinese's official website. The transfer fee wasn't officially announced but it is believed that Levski got at least 950 000 euros from the deal. Vutov made his Udinese first-team debut on 18 February, in a 0–3 friendly loss against Hajduk Split at Stadion Poljud, playing 78 minutes.

Cosenza (loan)
For the 2015-2016 season, Vutov was loaned out to Cosenza. He made 22 appearances for the club and scored a goal from the penalty spot.

Lecce (loan)
On 12 July 2016 Vutov was loaned out by Udinese to Lecce. On 30 July he debuted with the giallorossi and scored his first official goal for the club in a 2-1 win against Alto Vicentino in a Coppa Italia match.

Botev Plovdiv (loan)

In January 2017, Vutov was loaned out to Botev Plovdiv for the rest of the season. He made an official debut on 18 February during the 0-1 away win over Lokomotiv Gorna Oryahovitsa.

On 7 April, Vutov scored twice during the 7-1 win over PFC Montana. These were his first goals in any official games as a player of Botev Plovdiv. Couple of weeks later, on 22 April, Vutov scored a spectacular goal for the 0-3 away win over Slavia Sofia.

On 26 April Vutov scored a header after a magnificent assist provided by Todor Nedelev in the 1-1 draw with FC Vereya Stara Zagora during the 2nd leg of the semi-finals for the Bulgarian Cup. His goal secured the win for Botev Plovdiv with 2-1 on aggregate and his team proceeded to the final game.

On 19 May Vutov scored an important goal in the playoffs against Beroe Stara Zagora and Botev Plovdiv won on aggregate 2-4.

On 24 May Vutov scored the second goal for the 2-1 victory over Ludogorets Razgrad helping Botev Plovdiv to win the Bulgarian Cup for the third time in the history of the club.

During his loan in Botev Plovdiv Antonio Vutov played 16 games, provided 2 assists and scored 7 goals (2 goals in the  Bulgarian Cup tournament).

Levski Sofia (loan)
On 13 June 2017, Vutov returned to Levski Sofia on a season-long loan.

Lokomotiv Sofia
In July 2022, Vutov joined Lokomotiv Sofia as a free agent, signing a two-year contract.

International career
He made his debut for Bulgaria national football team on 31 March 2021 in a World Cup qualifier against Northern Ireland.

Career statistics

Honours
Botev Plovdiv
Bulgarian Cup: 2016–17

Personal life
Vutov is an avid Real Madrid fan and has cited Zinedine Zidane as his favourite player.

References

External links

Profile at LevskiSofia.info

1996 births
Living people
Bulgarian footballers
Bulgaria youth international footballers
PFC Levski Sofia players
Udinese Calcio players
Cosenza Calcio players
U.S. Lecce players
Botev Plovdiv players
Mezőkövesdi SE footballers
First Professional Football League (Bulgaria) players
Association football midfielders
People from Mezdra
Nemzeti Bajnokság I players
Expatriate footballers in Hungary
Bulgarian expatriate sportspeople in Hungary
Bulgarian expatriate footballers
Bulgaria under-21 international footballers
Bulgaria international footballers